The Last Man is a 2002 American science fiction romantic comedy film written and directed by Harry Ralston, and starring David Arnott, Jeri Ryan and Dan Montgomery.

Alan Gould, a neurotic, unkempt graduate student, thinks he may be the last man on Earth until he finds Sarah. Things are great, or so Alan thinks until they find the hitchhiker. This is a comedy about the relationships between men and women and what drives them, aggravated by a global catastrophe.

Plot 
Alan Gould, a neurotic, unkempt anthropology graduate student, is beginning to believe that he just might be the last living person on the planet. A mysterious catastrophe appears to have killed off everyone but him, leaving the buildings standing and goods untouched. When he's not running around in his underwear, revelling in his newly found freedom from body-shaming, he's in the abandoned stores downtown trying stuff out. Alan acquires a video camera on one of his expeditions and decides to make a video log explaining to any alien race that stumbles upon the empty planet what he thinks went wrong, interjected with references to his fieldwork among the primitive Shitabi tribe of the Amazon basin. He also tries, mostly unsuccessfully, to embrace the peaceful philosophy of the Shitabi people.

One day, much to Alan's delight, he finds Sarah. She is tall and shapely, but she is also fickle. Before the apocalypse, she wouldn't have spent time with Alan even if he was the last man on Earth. Sarah was the type of person who would sleep with her friend's lover or her lover's friends, and now she has convinced herself God is punishing her for her sins. She doesn't consider Alan to be an ideal mate, but he is all she has now. Alan, for his part, falls in love with her, and he convinces her that they will have to repopulate the world. She in turn makes him promise he will never leave her, and though she shies away from his touch, she reluctantly joins him in his RV.

While driving into town to gather supplies, the couple passes a hitchhiker carrying a large backpack. Alan's first impulse is to simply keep driving, but Sarah forces him to stop. The hitchhiker is Raphael, a handsome, charismatic young man. He doesn't appear to be as smart as Alan, but he's easygoing and quite engaging. He is everything Alan wishes to be. Sarah is immediately drawn to Raphael, and she transfers her fickle affections to him.

Seeing that he is losing Sarah to Raphael, Alan gets jealous and begins plotting ways to get rid of the competition. After a time he decides to let Fate take a hand, and he waits for Raphael to inevitably mess up, sending Sarah running back to him. Somehow, the two men blow up a memorial that Sarah had built. Alan talks to Raphael about it while secretly taping the conversation, but at the end of the conversation, Raphael decides to leave. The last thing he says to Alan is that he loves Sarah. Later on, Sarah asks Alan if he had talked to Raphael before he left, and Alan lies to her saying he hadn't — he didn't want to repeat Raphael's declaration of love. Raphael returns to the camp after finding one of the many notes Sarah had tied to balloons she had released, notes that all read, "Come back." After reconciling, the couple finds Alan's tapes and figures out that Alan had betrayed them, so they kick him out of the camp. Alan retaliates by driving a truck through the camp.

At the end, Alan places his camera on the ground and stands back. He tells his camera that he's heading south to find others who eat zinc, figuring that's the reason they all survived. He concludes with, "Life's a bitch, so be decent and try to respect one another's privacy." Then he runs up and punts the camera.

Cast 
 David Arnott as Alan Gould, a quirky male anthropology graduate student living in an camper on the outskirts of San Francisco
 Jeri Ryan as Sarah, a tall, shapely female, fickle by nature, and looking for companionship
 Dan Montgomery Jr. as Raphael, dumb as a post but good with his hands, he now competes for Sarah's affections

Release

Theaters 
Written and directed by Harry Ralston, The Last Man was released for limited engagements to theaters in New York City and Los Angeles on February 13, 2002, and March 8, 2002, respectively.

Home Media 
The Last Man was released to video on July 9, 2002, in VHS and DVD formats.

Reception

Box office 
The film grossed $3,908 at the domestic box office.

Critical Response 
On review aggregator website Rotten Tomatoes, the film has a 33% approval rating based on 12 reviews and an average rating of 4.70/10. Metacritic assigned the film a weighted average score of 32 out of 100 based on reviews from 9 critics, indicating "mixed or average reviews".

A.O. Scott, a critic with The New York Times wrote, " It feels more like a thought experiment than a fully developed story." Maitland McDonagh, a movie reviewer for TV Guide wrote, "Ralston gets solid performances out of his cast, and the film has a surprisingly polished look. But in the end, there isn't much to it." Lou Lumenick of the New York Post wrote, "Ryan, the bodacious Seven of Nine on "Star Trek Voyager," is the only excuse to suffer through writer-director Harry Ralston's feeble comedy." Ed Park, a critic at The Village Voice wrote, "If The Last Man were the last movie left on earth, there would be a toss-up between presiding over the end of cinema as we know it and another night of delightful hand shadows."

Accolades 
The Last Man was nominated for Best Film at the Fantasporto 2001 in Porto, Portugal. It won the Lumiere Award at the 2nd annual New Orleans Film Festival, and it won Best Independent Feature Award at the 11th edition of the Festival of Fantastic Films in Manchester, England.

See also

 List of American films of 2002
 Men Cry Bullets

References

External links 
 TheLastMan.com
 
 

2002 films
2002 science fiction films
American comedy-drama films
American disaster films
American post-apocalyptic films
American sex comedy films
American science fiction comedy-drama films
2000s English-language films
2002 comedy-drama films
2000s sex comedy films
2000s American films